Stephanie O'Sullivan (born October 3, 1959) is a former Principal Deputy Director of National Intelligence (PDDNI) who was appointed to that position on February 18, 2011. She worked to assist the Director of National Intelligence (DNI) in managing the day-to-day operations of the intelligence community. Prior to serving as PDDNI, she served as a senior leader at the Central Intelligence Agency (CIA), rising to the Associate Deputy Director of the CIA before being confirmed as the PDDNI.

Prior career
She served as the Associate Deputy Director of the CIA from December 2009 to February 2011. Before that position, Ms. O'Sullivan headed CIA's Directorate of Science and Technology for 4 years. In that role, she managed the CIA's technological innovation and support to case officer operations. In all, Ms. O'Sullivan spent over 14 years, combined in the Directorate of Science and Technology. Before the CIA, she worked in the Office of Naval Intelligence and at TRW, which is now part of Northrop Grumman.

Principal Deputy Director of National Intelligence

Nomination
She was nominated by President Barack Obama on January 5, 2011 at the recommendation of Director James R. Clapper. On February 15, 2011, the Senate Intelligence Committee voted unanimously to recommend O'Sullivan's confirmation to the Senate, which later unanimously confirmed her.

Career after public service

In November 2020, O'Sullivan was named a volunteer member of the Joe Biden presidential transition Agency Review Team to support transition efforts related to the United States Intelligence Community.

Education
Missouri University of Science and Technology
 Bachelor of Science in Civil engineering

References

External links

1959 births
Living people
Obama administration personnel
People from Cape Girardeau, Missouri
People of the Central Intelligence Agency
United States Deputy Directors of National Intelligence